Hwang Seong-gu (born October 23, 1973) is a South Korean screenwriter, best known for his work on Anarchist from Colony (2017).

Filmography 
If (1999) 
Lies (2004) 
Sad Movie (2005) 
My Girl and I (2005) 
Delivering Love (2008)
Terroir (2008; TV series)
Le Grand Chef 2: Kimchi Battle (2010) - adaptation
S.I.U. (2011) 
I Am the King (2012)
The Scent (2012) 
Tabloid Truth (2014) 
Anarchist from Colony (2017) 
Little Forest (2018) 
The Berlin File 2 (TBA)

Awards and nominations

References

External links 
 
 

1973 births
Living people
South Korean screenwriters